The Primulaceae , commonly known as the primrose family (but not related to the evening primrose family), are a family of herbaceous and woody flowering plants including some favourite garden plants and wildflowers. Most are perennial though some species, such as scarlet pimpernel, are annuals.

Previously one of three families in the order Primulales, it underwent considerable generic re-alignment once molecular phylogenetic methods were used for taxonomic classification. The order was then submerged in a much enlarged order Ericales and became a greatly enlarged Primulaceae sensu lato (s.l). In this new classification of the Angiosperm Phylogeny Group, each of the Prumulales families was reduced to the rank of subfamily of Primulaceae s.l. The original Primulaceae (Primulaceae sensu stricto or s.s.) then became subfamily Primuloideae, and one genus (Maesa) was raised to the rank of a separate subfamily, making four in all.

Description 

The family shares a number of characteristics, including  haplostemonous flowers having the same number of petals and stamens, sympetalous corolla having the petals united, stamens opposite the petals, free central placentation, bitegmic (two layered) ovules and nuclear endosperm formation.

Stems 
Primulaceae are mostly herbaceous, having no woody stem, except that some form cushions (spreading mats a few inches high) and their stems are stiffened by lignin. The stems can grow upright (erect) or spread out horizontally and then turn upright (decumbent).

Leaves 
Leaves are simple, being directly attached to the stem by a petiole (stalk), but unlike the leaves of most flowering plants they have no stipules. The petiole is short or the leaf tapers gradually towards the base. Leaf arrangement is typically alternate but some are opposite or whorled, and there is generally a rosette at the base of the stem. The edges are toothed (dentate) or sawtoothed. New leaves in the bud are usually involute (rolled towards the upper surface) or conduplicate (folded upwards), but a few species roll downwards.

Flowers 
Each flower is bisexual, having both stamens and carpels. They have radial symmetry;  the petals can be separate or partially or fully fused together to form a tube-shaped corolla that opens up at the mouth to form a bell-like shape (as in item 8 in the figure) or a flat-faced flower. In most of the families of Ericales, stamens alternate with lobes, but in Primulaceae there is a stamen opposite each petal.

The calyx has 4 to 9 lobes and persists after flowering. They are grouped in unbranched, indeterminate clusters such as racemes, spikes, corymbs or umbels.

Reproductive anatomy 
The fruit of Primulaceae begins as an ovary and inside it are the future seeds (ovules). These are attached to a central axis without any partitions between them (an arrangement called free central placentation; see item 7 in the figure), and they are bitegmic (having a double protective layer around each ovule). Unlike in most other families of Ericales, both layers form the opening at the top (the micropyle).

Seeds and fruit 
As seeds develop, an endosperm grows around the embryo through free division of nuclei without forming walls (nuclear endosperm formation). The embryo forms a pair of short, narrow cotyledons (item 10 in the figure). Usually multiple seeds are in a capsule that is carried on a straight stalk (pedicel or scape). After it matures, it splits apart, releasing the seeds ballistically.

Taxonomy

History 

The taxonomic history of Primulaceae has been long and complex. The botanical authority for the family name is given to August Batsch (1794), as Batsch ex Borkh, using the term Primulae with six genera, the valid description being subsequently given by Borkhausen (1797). Some earlier authors attributed the name to Ventenat (1799), as Primulaceae Vent., who described the Primulacées, but Batsch had precedence.

Linnaeus (1753) placed Primula and related primuloid genera in the Hexandria Monogynia (six stamens one pistil) in his sexual classification based on reproductive characteristics. Jussieu arranged Linnaeus' genera in a hierarchical system of ranks based on the relative value of a much wider range of characteristics. In his Genera plantarum (1789) he organised the primuloid genera into two Ordo (families), within a class (VIII) he called Dicotyledones Monopetalae Corolla Hypogyna, based on the cotyledons (two), form of the petals (fused), and position of the corolla with respect to the ovary (below).  Jussieu's families were the Lysimachiae, including Primula and Theophrasta and the Sapotae, including Myrsine, these being the three main lineages in modern understanding.   

The most complete treatment of the Primulaceae family, with nearly 1,000 species arranged into 22 genera, was by Pax and Knuth in 1905 in the Engler system. They divided the family into five tribes (and several subtribes); Androsaceae, Cyclamineae, Lysimachieae, Samoleae and Corideae. Many systems since have lacked consistency, but generally recognised two major groups as either tribes or subfamilies, the Lysimachieae and Primuleae (the Androsaceae of Pax and Knuth), with the largest genera being Primula, Lysimachia and Androsace.
In the Cronquist system (1988), Cronquist included the three closely related families, Primulaceae, Myrsinaceae and Theophrastaceae in the order Primulales, of subclass Dilleniidae, based on morphological characteristics, in particular, ovaries with free-central placentation, a feature considered synapomorphic. His circumscription of Primulaceae included about 800 species.

Molecular phylogenetics 

These three families were referred to as the primuloid families. With the later development of molecular phylogenetic methods, the Primulales were found to be more closely related to other families within the Ericales, and the three primuloid families were subsequently absorbed into an expanded Ericales (Ericales sensu lato or s.l.), making 24 families within that order, where the primuloids formed a monophyletic clade. It was also apparent that Myrsinaceae were paraphyletic, unless the genus Maesa was segregated and elevated to become a new monogeneric family, Maesaceae, but also that Primulaceae were probably paraphyletic.

In the first consensus taxonomic classification, the Angiosperm Phylogeny Group (APG 1998), these proposals were recognised by including Primulaceae within Ericales, as Eudicots, forming one of three clades in the Asterids (Asteridae). Maesa was formally segregated in 2000. Further changes came from analysis of DNA sequence data. This led to the move of genera (primarily terrestrial non-basal-rosette) from Primulaceae to Mysinaceae and Theophrastaceae. At this time Primulaceae was considered to consist of nine tribes (Primuleae, Androsaceae, Ardisiandreae, Lysimachieae, Glauceae, Anagallideae, Corideae, Cyclamineae, and Samoleae). Notably, Lysimachieae and three smaller tribes, Corideae, Cyclamineae and Ardisiandreae, were transferred to Myrsinaceae, and Samoleae to Theophrastaceae. This enlarged Myrsinaceae is distinguished as Myrsinaceae s.l. in comparison to the previous smaller family, Myrsinaceae s.s. (less Maesa). Some authors preferred to raise Samoleae to its own family, Samolaceae, but this has not been accepted by subsequent authors, placing it within Theophrastaceae, while recognising its distinct position within that grouping. These transfers, to preserve monophyly at the family level essentially left two tribes remaining in Primulaceae, the Primuleae and Androsaceae, with about 15 genera sharing a number of common characteristics. These additional changes were reflected in the 2003 revision of the APG system (APG II), where the now four primuloid families were among 23 in Ericales. This restricted Primulaceae sensu stricto (s.s.) consisted of three groups: The Primulae, including Primula, the largest genus; the Androsaceae, including Androsace, the second largest genus; together with a small third group containing Soldanella, Hottonia, Omphalogramma and Bryocarpum.

The APG third classification system (APG III, 2009) discussed all the taxonomic challenges arising from the phylogenetic studies, and placed all primuloid genera into one large Primulaceae s.l., corresponding to Cronquist's Primulales. They stated that "The biggest problem for APG III was the question of how to treat Primulaceae and their immediate relatives, a closely related group that in the past has often been recognized as a separate order". The decision to treat all genera as a single family was based on the observation that the new circumscriptions had little in the way of apomorphies, but the entire group had numerous synapomorphies and were easy to recognise. This resulted in an Ericales with 22 families. Consequently, the four primuloid families were reduced to the rank of subfamilies within Primulaceae s.l.

Phylogeny 
Primulaceae s.l. sensu APG III form part of the speciose (species rich) Asterid order Ericales s.l., with about 12,000 species and 22 families as per APG IV. Ericalees is one of four major clades within the asterids, where it is sister to the euasterids. The phylogenetic structure of Ericales, as shown in the following cladogram, consists of seven major suprafamilial clades (e.g. balsaminoids, styracoids) and a group of "core" Ericales. Within the eracalean families, Primulaceae s.l. is shown as a sister group to Ebenaceae, and both are sister to Sapotaceae. These three families make up the primuloid clade.

Evolution and biogeography 

The fossil record of Primulaceae s.l. is sparse, but the crown group has been estimated as c. 46-61 million years old. The crown primuloids have been dated to c. 102 mya, with Primulaceae/Ebenaceae divergence at 80 mya. Crown ages for the Primulaceae subfamilies vary from 24 mya for the Maesoideae, the basal group, to 70 mya for the Theophrastoideae.

The primuloids probably originated in a shared Neotropical/Indo-Malaysian ancestral range, with the Primulaceae/Ebenaceae clade occupying the neotropics. Theophrastoideae is nearly all neotropical with a more recent migration out of the realm found in the aquatic Samolus genus. The divergence between Theophrastoideae and Primuloideae-Myrsinoideae at 70 mya represents a vicariant event between the Neotropics and the Palearctic in the case of the latter. The Primuloideae originating in the Palearctic, persisted till the last 16 mya, when it started to shift into the Nearctic.

Subdivision 
The three former families of the Primulales, together with the segregated Maesaceae, have been re-circumscribed into the broadly defined Primulaceae sensu lato (s.l.) The two uniting features of this family are a free central placenta and one stamen opposite each of the corolla lobes. The cladogram below shows the infrafamilial phylogenetic relationships, together with the subfamilial crown ages. Maesoideae forms the basal group, while Primuloideae and 
Myrsinoideae are in a sister group relationship.

Christenhusz et al. (2016, 2017) list 2,790 species and 53 genera, varying from 1 in Maesoideae to 38 in Myrsinoideae, with 8 in Theophrastoideae and the remaining 6 in Primuloideae. Byng (2014) and Plants of the World Online list 55 accepted genera. The generic limits of Myrsinoideae are not fully resolved and the status of a number of genera is under revision.

Subfamilies

Etymology 
The Primulaceae are named for their nominative and type genus, Primula. Linnaeus used this name to reflect its place among the first flowers of spring, given the primrose's vernacular Latin name of primula veris, primula (feminine diminutive primus, first + veris (genitive ver, spring).

Distribution and habitat 

Distribution is cosmopolitan.

Cultivation 

The British National Collection of Double Primroses is held at Glebe Garden, at North Petherwin, in North Cornwall.

Notes

References

Bibliography

Books

Chapters 
 , in 
 , in 
 , in 
 , in 
 , in

Historical sources

Articles

Ericales

Maesoideae

Myrsinoideae

Primuloideae

Theophrastoideae

APG

Websites

External links

 
Ericales families
Taxa named by August Batsch